Eulithidium pterocladicum is a species of sea snail, a marine gastropod mollusk in the family Phasianellidae.

Description
The shell grows to a height of 8 mm.

Distribution
This marine species occurs in the Gulf of Mexico off Florida.

References

 Robertson, R. 1958. The family Phasianellidae in the Western Atlantic. Johnsonia 3: 245–283
 Rosenberg, G., F. Moretzsohn, and E. F. García. 2009. Gastropoda (Mollusca) of the Gulf of Mexico, Pp. 579–699 in Felder, D.L. and D.K. Camp (eds.), Gulf of Mexico–Origins, Waters, and Biota. Biodiversity. Texas A&M Press, College Station, Texas.

Phasianellidae
Gastropods described in 1958